H visa may refer to:

 H-1A visa, previously available to foreign nationals seeking temporary employment in the United States as nurses
 H-1C visa, previously available to foreign nationals seeking temporary employment in the United States as nurses
 H-1B visa, allowing US employers to temporarily employ foreign workers in specialty occupations
 H-1B1 visa, a variant of the H-1B visa in the United States for nationals of Singapore and Chile
 H-2A visa, allows a foreign national entry into the US for temporary or seasonal agricultural work
 H-2B visa, allowing US employers to hire foreign workers to come temporarily to the United States and perform temporary nonagricultural services or labor
 H-3 visa, for trainees or special education exchange visitors
 H-4 visa, for dependents of those admitted under other H class visas